The Prinsenhof (Dutch; literally "Princes' Court") or Hof ten Walle ("Court at the Walls") was a historic building in Ghent, East Flanders in Belgium which served as the official residence of the Counts of Flanders from the 15th century after the Gravensteen fell into disuse. It was used by the Counts of Flanders since at least 1366, having previously been the home of the financier Simon de Mirabello. It was completely rebuilt by Philip the Good (1396–1467) who lived there in his youth. Charles V, Holy Roman Emperor was born there in 1500. Today only the postern gate survives.

See also
Gravensteen

External links

Buildings and structures in Ghent
County of Flanders
Tourist attractions in Ghent